There are two towns called Frankton in New Zealand:
 Frankton, Otago is located close to Queenstown in the South Island
 Frankton, Waikato is located close to Hamilton in the North Island